The following is a chronological list of French architects. Some of their major architectural works are listed after each name.

Middle Ages
Étienne de Bonneuil (late 13th century)
 Uppsala Cathedral, Sweden

Jean de Chelles (13th century)
 Notre Dame de Paris

Pierre de Montreuil (c. 1200–1266)
 Notre Dame de Paris
 the Abbey of Saint-Germain-des-Prés
 Saint Denis Basilica

Matthias of Arras (?–1352)
 Saint Vitus Cathedral in Prague

Villard de Honnecourt (14th century) – architecture plans

Pierre d'Angicourt (late 13th century)

 Lucera castle

Pierre de Chaule (late 13th century)

 Castel Nuovo

Renaissance to Revolution
Jacques I Androuet du Cerceau (c. 1510–c. 1585)
Important book of architectural engravings

Philibert Delorme (or De L'Orme) (1510/1515–1570)
 Chateau d'Anet (c.1550) – for Diane de Poitiers
 Tuileries Palace (1564–1567)

Pierre Lescot (1515–1578)
 Louvre Palace (Lescot Wing, 1546) – for Francis I and Henry II
 Hôtel Carnavalet (attributed, begun 1547)
 Fontaine des Innocents (1550) – carved by Jean Goujon

Jean Baptiste Androuet du Cerceau (c. 1545–1590)
 Pont Neuf (1599) – for Henry IV

Jacques Androuet II du Cerceau (c. 1550–1614)
 Grande Galerie du Louvre
 Pavillon de Flore (Tuileries)

Salomon de Brosse (1575–1626)
 Luxembourg Palace (1615) – for Marie de' Medici
 St. Gervais church (facade) (1616)
 Château de Blérancourt
 Palais de Justice in Rennes (1618)

Jean Androuet du Cerceau (1585–1649)
 Hôtel de Sully (1624–1629)

Jacques Lemercier (1585–1654) – active for Richelieu
 Palais-Cardinal (1632) – for Richelieu
 Château de Richelieu
 City of Richelieu (from 1631)
 La Sorbonne church (1635) – for Richelieu
 Pavillon de l'Horloge (Louvre)
 St. Roch church
 Abbaye du Val-de-Grâce (1646–1653, further construction)

François Mansart (1598–1666)
 Château de Blois (1635–1638)
 Abbaye du Val-de-Grâce (1643–1646, plans and initial construction) – for Anne d'Autriche (Anne of Austria)
 Château de Maisons (1642–1646)
 Hôtel de Guénégaud (1648–1651)
 Hôtel Carnavalet (1655) remodel
 Hôtel d'Aumont remodel after Louis Le Vau

Louis Le Vau (1612–1670)
 Apollo wing of the Louvre
 Hôtel Lambert (1640)
 Vaux-le-Vicomte (1656) – for Nicolas Fouquet; this was to be the prototype of the Palace of Versailles
 Hôtel de Lauzun (1657)
 Château de Vincennes (1659) – for Mazarin
 Palace of Versailles – reconstruction, on the model of his Vaux-le-Vicomte, as a place of fêtes
 Saint-Louis-en-l'Île church (on the Île Saint-Louis) (1664) plans
 Collège des Quatre-Nations (now the Institut de France) – for Mazarin

Claude Perrault (1613–1688) – helped to establish French classicism

 Colonnade of the Louvre (1667–1673)
 Observatoire de Paris – plans

Libéral Bruant (c. 1636–1697)
 Hôtel de la Salpêtrière (1660–1677)
 Les Invalides (1671–1676)

Jules Hardouin Mansart (Jules Hardouin; he adopted the name Mansart in 1668) (1646–1708) – responsible for the massive expansion of the palace of Versailles into a permanent royal residence.
 Palace of Versailles (from 1678) Royal Stables, Orangerie, Grand Trianon, Chapel
 Palace of Saint-Cloud – for the Philip I, Duke of Orléans
Château of Marly
 Domed chapel of Les Invalides
 Place des Victoires
 Place Vendôme
 Château de Meudon

Pierre Lassurance (1655–1724)
 Château de Petit-Bourg

Robert de Cotte (1656–1735) brother-in-law of J.H. Mansart, whom he assisted on numerous projects
 Esplanade of Les Invalides
 Palais Rohan, Strasbourg

Germain Boffrand (1667–1754)
 Château Lunéville
 Remodelling of the Petit Luxembourg
 Interiors at the Hôtel de Soubise

Pierre-Alexis Delamair (1675/6–1745)
 Hôtel de Soubise
 Hôtel de Rohan

Jean Aubert (c. 1680–1741)
 Stables of the Château de Chantilly
 Hôtel Biron
 Palais Bourbon

Ange-Jacques Gabriel (1698–1782) – responsible for rococo constructions at Versailles
 Palace of Versailles (1735–1777) apartment of the king, Versailles Opera, Library, Petit Trianon (1762–1764)
 Place de la Concorde (Place Louis XV)
 École Militaire (1751–1775)

Jacques-Germain Soufflot (1713–1780)
 The Panthéon (called the Eglise Sainte Geneviève) (1756–1780)

Pierre-Louis Moreau-Desproux (1727–1793)
 Rue St. Honoré facade of the Palais-Royal in Paris (1770)
 Second Salle du Palais-Royal, first purpose-built opera house in Paris

Étienne-Louis Boullée (1728–1799)
 Hôtel Alexandre

Joseph Brousseau (1733–1797)
 Various chateaux in the Limoges and the Limousin region

Claude Nicolas Ledoux (1736–1806) – famous for his mathematical neoclassicism.
 Wall of the Farmers-General (1784–1791) – visible at the Place de la Nation and Denfert-Rochereau
 Hôtel d'Hallwyl (remodel)
 Royal Saltworks at Arc-et-Senans (Les Salines Royales)

Jean-Jacques Lequeu (1757–1826)

Revolution to World War II
Henri Labrouste (1801–1875) – famous for his use of steel
Bibliothèque Sainte-Geneviève (1843–1861)
National Library

Victor Baltard (1805–1874) – famous for his use of steel and glass
Les Halles centrales (1854–1870) – destroyed in 1971 to make way for a shopping mall
St. Eustache (church) – remodel
Saint-Étienne-du-Mont (church) – remodel
St. Augustin (church) (1860–1871)

Eugène Emmanuel Viollet-le-Duc (1814–1879) – important theoretician of the 19th-century Gothic revival
Château de Pierrefonds – restoration
Notre Dame de Paris – restoration
the city of Carcassonne – restoration
Saint-Germain-des-Prés (church) – restoration
Saint Séverin (church) – restoration

Charles Garnier (1825–1898) – celebrated architect of the Second Empire
Palais Garnier, also known as the Paris Opera (now Opera Garnier) (1862–1875)
Théâtre Marigny
Casino of Monte Carlo (1878)

Clair Tisseur (1827–1896), Romanesque Revival architect and designer 
 Église du Bon-Pasteur, Lyon (1875–1883)

Frantz Jourdain (1847–1935) – Art Nouveau architect and theorist
La Samaritaine, Paris (1903-1907)
Auguste Louzier Sainte-Anne (1848-1925) – Chief architect of historic monuments

Eugène Vallin (1856–1922) – Art nouveau architect, member of the École de Nancy
Vallin House and Studio (with Georges Biet) (1896)
Vaxelaire Department Store (with Emile André) (1901)
Biet Apartment House (with Georges Biet) (1902)
Société Générale Bank/Aimé Apartment House (with Georges Biet) (1904–1906)
École de Nancy Pavilion, Exposition Internationale de l'Est de la France (1909)

Lucien Weissenburger (1860–1929) – Art nouveau architect, member of the École de Nancy
Magasins Réunis (department store), Nancy (1890–1907)
Villa Majorelle, Nancy (with Henri Sauvage) (1898–1901)
Imprimerie Royer (printing house), Nancy (1899–1900)
Brenas Apartment House, Nancy (1902)
Bergeret House, Nancy (1904)
Weissenburger House, Nancy (1904–1906)
Brasserie Excelsior and Angleterre Hotel, Nancy (with Alexandre Mienville) (1911)
Vaxelaire, Pignot, and Company Department Store, Nancy (1913)

Hector Guimard (1867–1942) – Art nouveau architect and designer

Émile André (1871–1933) – Art nouveau architect, urbanist and artist, member of the École de Nancy
Vaxelaire Department Store, Nancy (with Eugène Vallin) (1901)
Parc de Saurupt, Nancy (garden-city), designer (with Henri Gutton) (1901–1906)
Maisons Huot, Nancy (1903)
France-Lanord Apartment Building, Nancy (1902–1903)
Lombard Apartment Building, Nancy (1902–1904)
Renauld Bank, Nancy (with Paul Charbonnier) (1908–1910)
Ducret Apartment Building, Nancy (with Paul Charbonnier) (1908–1910)

Auguste Perret (1874–1954) and his brothers Claude and Gustave – important for the first use of reinforced concrete
Théâtre des Champs-Élysées

Paul Tournon (1881–1964)

Robert Mallet-Stevens (1886–1945) – modernist architect influenced by Le Corbusier

Le Corbusier (Charles-Edouard Jeanneret) (1887–1965)

Léon Azéma (1888–1978) – appointed Architect of the City of Paris in 1928
Douaumont ossuary (1932)

Eugène Beaudouin (1898–1983) – influential use of prefabricated elements

Jean Prouvé (1901–1984) – international style/Bauhaus-inspired

François Spoerry (1912–1999)
 Grimaud, Var, France
 Puerto Escondido, Baja California Sur, Mexico
 Port Liberté, Jersey City, New Jersey, United States
 Bendinat, Majorca, Spain
 Saifi Village, Beirut, Lebanon

Post World War II

Christian de Portzamparc (born 1944)
La Villette City of Music
Café Beaubourg

Henry Bernard (1912–94)
 Palace of Europe

Jean-Marie Charpentier
Shanghai Grand Theatre

Pascale Guédot (born 1960)
Médiathèque at Oloron-Sainte-Marie (Prix de l'Équerre d'Argent)

Michel Mossessian
Five Merchant Square in London, UK
NATO Headquarters in Brussels, Belgium
ExxonMobil Technology Centre in Shanghai, China

Jean Nouvel (born 1945)
Institut du Monde Arabe
Fondation Cartier
Torre Agbar, in Barcelona, Spain
Musée du quai Branly

Fernand Pouillon (1912-1986)

 Old Port of Marseille
 Tabriz railway station 
 Résidence Salmson Le Point du Jour
 Chateau de Belcastel

Roger Taillibert
 Parc des Princes in Paris
 Olympic Stadium in Montreal, Quebec, Canada
 Olympic Velodrome, Montreal (now called the Montreal Biodome)
 Olympic Pool (Montreal)

Michel Pinseau
 Hassan II Mosque in Casablanca, Morocco

Philippe Ameller and Jacques Dubois  
Eurotunnel in Calais
ISIPCA in Versailles
Centre de la petite enfance in Issy-les-Moulineaux
Lycée Louis-Armand in Eaubonne
Police station in Provins

Florent Nédélec, DPLG
The Jervois Hong Kong
Yong He Yuan Taiwan

See also

 French Baroque architecture
 List of architects
 List of French people

French
Architects